Elections were held in Tamil Nadu on 17 and 19 October 2011 for the chairs and council members of all local bodies in the state. To the three levels of urban local bodies: 10 chairs (mayors) and 820 members of municipal corporations; 125 chairs and 3,697 members of municipal councils; and 529 chairs and 8,303 members of town councils. To the three tires of rural local bodies: 12,524 chairs and 99,333 members of village panchayats; 385 chairs and 6,470 members of township panchayats; and 31 chairs and 655 members of district panchayats. The ruling party in the state, the All India Anna Dravida Munnetra Kazhagam (AIADMK), won a landslide victory, securing all of the corporation mayoral posts and a plurality of the other posts.

Election results
AIADMK received 39.02% of the popular vote: 39.24% of the urban vote and 38.69% of the rural vote. DMK received 26.09% of the popular vote: 26.67% of the urban vote and 25.71% of the rural vote. DMDK received 10.11% of the popular vote. Congress received 5.71% of the popular vote. PMK received 3.55% of the popular vote. MDMK received 1.70% of the popular vote. The Communist Party (Marxist) received 1.02% of the popular vote, and the Communist Party 0.71%. Independents received an additional 9.46% of votes.

Elections to village panchayats are non-party contests.

References

External links
Local body election notification 2011
Tamil Nadu state election commission
Party Wise Percentage 2011

2010s in Tamil Nadu
2011 elections in India
Local government in Tamil Nadu
Local elections in Tamil Nadu